There is no snake officially known as the "Yellow-bellied black snake". However, the term is used for several Australian snakes:

Green tree snake (Dendrelaphis punctulata)
Eastern tiger snake
Red-bellied Black Snake